The original Estadio Nacional del Perú, originally known as Estadio Guadalupe, was a stadium that existed from July 18, 1897 until 1951 when it began, on the same land, the construction of Peru's current National Stadium. From 1921 this place was called Sports National Stadium since it was established as the main sports arena for the practice of football in Peru.

History 
In the late 19th century, When football practice began in the Peruvian city of Lima, there were only two grounds on which they could play soccer. One of them located in Lima Owned by Lima Cricket and Football Club another in El Callao located on the south coast of the province, an area known as Mar brava.

In 1896 the now-defunct club Cricket Union asked the Lima City Council the transfer of land suitable for sports, being so awarded the March 28 of that year, the land that belonged to the deceased Lima Gun Club and located in the vicinity of Exposition Park in the area known as Santa Beatriz and now belongs to Lima District.

The official opening of the sports stadium suitable for football practice gave July 18 of 1897 under the name Guadalupe Stage. Thus, this area became the first major sports scene for the exclusive practice of football that was created in the country. This scenario played the first Peruvian championship and converted. It is not known exactly when the field was reversed in favor of Peruvian State.

For 1921, Lima underwent a process of embellishment mainly driven by president Augusto B. Leguia to celebrate the centenary of the Independence of Peru. Among these buildings, there were presents major foreign colonies residing in Peru. The colony English presented as well, the construction and expansion of the stadium on the same ground once occupied by the Guadalupe Stage to the new premises and was christened Lima's National Stadium.

The initial approach involved the construction of a large sports complex and therefore its construction took several years. El Nacional had a wooden platform and some preferential side boxes at floor level, which made it a simple style stadium. It also had an auxiliary field without stands. In addition, the sports complex had a Pool Olympic donated by the colony Japanese in 1935.

The November 1 of 1927, Under the South American Championship 1927 This exhibition was the first game played by a Peruvian football selection, Facing the combined Uruguayan that came to be Olympic champion in the sport. Uruguay won that day by 4 to 0, but marked the beginning of the National Stadium as the only seat of the Peruvian team. Twelve days after that meeting, the November 13 of 1927 Stadium witnessed the first goal scored by a Peruvian team in the match against the Bolivia national football team.

The National Stadium was counting on building extensions and other platforms, all of wood. By that time was the main playground of the most popular teams in the country, Alianza Lima and Universitario de DeportesAt a time when football was consolidated as the most popular sport in the country.

In 1951, during the administration of President Manuel A. Odría, Lima's National Stadium was closed and demolished to make way for the construction of the current National Stadium. their wooden stands were intended for other sports venues, mainly inside the country and also to Estadio Teodoro Lolo Fernandez Club Universitario de Deportes. This stadium was in memory of football fans by the nickname of Old National Stadium.

External links
 David Goldblatt; World Soccer Yearbook; 2002 

Nacional
Nacional
19th century in Lima
1897 establishments in Peru
1951 disestablishments
Defunct football venues in Peru
20th century in Lima
History of Lima
Demolished buildings and structures in Peru